Ensipia is a genus of moths of the family Erebidae. The genus was erected by Francis Walker in 1859.

The Global Lepidoptera Names Index gives this name as a synonym of Hyamia Walker, 1859.

Species
Based on Butterflies and Moths of the World and Encyclopedia of Life:
Ensipia andaca
Ensipia lamusalis Walker, 1859
Ensipia pallens
Ensipia trilineata

References

Calpinae